Juventus F.C. finished the season second in Serie A. They also won the Coppa Italia and reached the final of the European Cup.

Squad

Transfers

Autumn

Competitions

Serie A

League table

Results by round

Matches

Goalscorers
Michel Platini 16		
Paolo Rossi     7
Roberto Bettega 6 
Zbigniew Boniek 5 
Marco Tardelli  5
Sergio Brio     3
Gaetano Scirea  3
Antonio Cabrini 1
Domenico Marocchino 1

Coppa Italia 

First round

Eightfinals

Quarterfinals

Semifinals

Final

European Cup

First round

Second round

Quarter-finals

Semi-finals

Final

Statistics

Players statistics

References

Juventus F.C. seasons
Juventus